Olev Vinn  (January 26, 1971) is Estonian paleobiologist and paleontologist.

Vinn graduated from the biology class of Tallinn 3. Secondary School in 1989. He studied geology at the University of Tartu from 1989 to 1993. Vinn holds an M.Sc. 
degree in paleontology and stratigraphy from the University of Tartu in 1995 and a Ph.D. degree in geology from the same university in 2001. He is senior research fellow 
in paleontology at the University of Tartu since 2007. He has published more than 190 peer reviewed papers in international scientific journals. Since 2021 he is editor of Journal of Paleontology.

Taxonomic studies
Vinn has described new genera and species of brachiopods, cornulitids, microconchids, serpulid polychaetes and trace fossils. He is a specialist of extinct tubicolous fossils. A microconchid species Microconchus vinni is named in honour of his taxonomic studies of tentaculitoid tubeworms.

Biomineralization studies
Vinn has described majority of annelid skeletal ultrastructures. Oriented tube structures are present in many serpulid species and cannot be explained by the standard carbonate slurry model. Vinn and his co-authors have hypothesized that oriented structures in serpulid tubes have been secreted in the same way as in mollusc shells, based on their ultrastructural similarity. Vinn and his co-authors proposed alternative ways to explain the calcified secretory granules described by Neff  in the lumen of the calcium-secreting glands in serpulids. They proposed that worm actually produces calcium-saturated mucus in the glands. The mucus is then deposited on the tube aperture, where crystallization of the structure is controlled by an organic matrix, as in molluscs. The calcified granules in the glands may only be an artifact of fixation and formed after the death of the worm.

Paleoecology studies
Vinn has studied evolution of symbiosis in several groups of early invertebrates such as cornulitids, microconchids, bryozoans, brachiopods, crinoids, stromatoporoids, tabulates and rugosans. He has described serpulid faunas of Mesozoic to Recent hydrocarbon seeps. A Late Devonian coral species ?Michelinia vinni is named in honour of his contribution to knowledge of ecology of Palaeozoic bioconstructing organisms. A crinoid species name Hiiumaacrinus vinni recognizes his significant contributions to the Silurian paleontology of Estonia.

Publications
Some of Vinn's more important publications include:

 
 
 
 
 
 Vinn, O. and Mõtus, M.-A. 2012. Diverse early endobiotic coral symbiont assemblage from the Katian (Late Ordovician) of Baltica. Palaeogeography, Palaeoclimatology, Palaeoecology 321–322, 137–141.

References

External links
Estonian Science Portal
ResearchGate
Olev Vinn's publications

1971 births
Estonian paleontologists
Estonian geologists
Estonian biologists
People from Tallinn
University of Tartu alumni
Living people